Domningia is an extinct genus of mammal which existed in what is now India during the Miocene period. It is named in honor of Daryl Domning, a sirenian specialist.

References

Miocene sirenians
Fossil taxa described in 2009
Extinct animals of India
Prehistoric placental genera